İsbike (styled as isbike) is a public bicycle sharing system serving İstanbul, the largest city in Turkey.

Launched in 2012, it serves with 300 stations and 3000 bikes on both sides of the city. In 2022 bicycling training was started.

System components
The system uses Baksi smart biking system. The users can either get membership or use their credit cards to access the bikes.

Rates
All trips are charged, whether or not the user is a member.

Maintenance 

isbike was included in the 2022 budget due to votes by city residents. Due to maintenance bikes were not available in January 2022, but later that year there were complaints about empty and closed stations, for example in Zeytinburnu.

See also

Bicycle sharing system
List of bicycle sharing systems
Utility cycling - Short-term hire schemes

References

External links
 Official website

Community bicycle programs
Bicycle sharing in Turkey